Petrobacter succinatimandens is a species of bacteria. It was identified in an Australian oil well.   it is the only known species of its genus.

References

Rhodocyclaceae